The 1953 Stanley Cup Finals was contested by the Boston Bruins and the Montreal Canadiens. The Bruins were appearing in the Final for the first time since . The Canadiens, who were appearing in their third straight Finals series, won the series four games to one.

Paths to the Finals
Montreal defeated the Chicago Black Hawks 4–3 to reach the Finals. Boston defeated the defending champion Detroit Red Wings 4–2 to reach the Finals.

The series
Jacques Plante was pulled after the first two games in favour of Gerry McNeil. The move paid off as McNeil posted two shutouts in the last three games.

Stanley Cup engraving
The 1953 Stanley Cup was presented to Canadiens captain Emile Bouchard by NHL President Clarence Campbell following the Canadiens 1–0 overtime win over the Bruins in game five.

The following Canadiens players and staff had their names engraved on the Stanley Cup

1952–53 Montreal Canadiens

See also 
 List of Stanley Cup champions

Notes

References 

 Podnieks, Andrew; Hockey Hall of Fame (2004). Lord Stanley's Cup. Bolton, Ont.: Fenn Pub. pp 12, 50. 

Stanley Cup
Stanley Cup Finals
Stanley Cup Finals
Stanley Cup Finals
1950s in Boston
Ice hockey competitions in Montreal
1950s in Montreal
1953 in Quebec
Ice hockey competitions in Boston